The Blind Goddess may refer to:

The Blind Goddess (1926 film)
The Blind Goddess (1948 film)
The Blind Goddess (play)